Greatest Hits: The Atlantic Years is a greatest hits album by American Christian metal band P.O.D. It was the first P.O.D. release since the group left Atlantic Records. Released on November 21, 2006, it sold 10,000 copies in its first week. The album included The Warriors EP Vol. 1 if purchased at Best Buy stores. Some of such pack-in copies are still available at retail.

The Atlantic Years contains 17 tracks, ranging from fan favorites, Christian radio hits, and secular radio hits. The album includes two previously unreleased songs, "Going in Blind" (recorded for Greatest Hits) and "Here We Go" (Testify B-side). The former was released as a single to promote The Atlantic Years. "Truly Amazing" was only previously released on an album of songs inspired by The Passion of the Christ. "Sleeping Awake" was recorded for The Matrix Reloaded.

Track listing

Chart positions

Album

Songs

References

P.O.D. albums
2006 greatest hits albums
Atlantic Records compilation albums